MUSU may refer to

 University of Melbourne Student Union, one of several student organisations at the University of Melbourne, Australia
 University of Manchester Students' Union, student organisation of the University of Manchester, England
 Middlesex University Students' Union, student organisation of Middlesex University, London, England
 Musu Dior, creator of Christian Dior perfume company.